Dreiseenplatte is the name of three lakes in Feldmoching-Hasenbergl in the northern part of Munich, Germany.

The lakes are: Lerchenauer See, Fasaneriesee and Feldmochinger See.

Photos 

Lakes of Bavaria
Geography of Munich